Amma is a 1952 Malayalam film directed by Jairus Paul Victor, written by Nagavally R. S. Kurup and produced by T. E. Vasudevan. The film is based on L. V. Prasad's Telugu movie Shavukar.

The film was a moderate success at the box office. It was one of the two films that enjoyed success among the 11 Malayalam films which released in 1952, the other being the Prem Nazir-starrer Visappinte Vili.

The film was also made in Tamil with the same title; Amma. Sandilyan wrote the dialogues.

Plot
The film tells the tale of Lakshmi Amma, a loving mother, and her son Venu. Venu falls in love with Radha, a rich lady, and later marries her. After the marriage, Venu and Radha shift to Madras. He manages to send some money to his mother in the beginning. But as days went, Radha intervenes and Venu is not able to send any more money to his poor mother. Meanwhile, a private moneylender from whom Lakshmi Amma had borrowed some money for Venu's marriage, kicks her out of the house. Venu brings Lakshmi Amma to his Madras residence, but Radha is not ready to allow her to stay there. This creates problems and Lakshmi Amma has to leave the house. She is thrown to the streets. A lot of dramatic happenings form the rest of the story.

Cast

Male cast
Thikkurissy Sukumaran Nair
M. N. Nambiar
T. S. Durairaj
P. M. Devan
Gopalan Nair
T. S. Muthaiah
Sharma

Female cast
B. S. Saroja
Lalitha
Aranmula Ponnamma
P. Shanthakumari

Soundtrack

Music was composed by V. Dakshinamurthy for both Malayalam and Tamil editions.
Malayalam
There were 14 songs in the film and many were hits. Lyrics were penned by P. Bhaskaran. Playback singers were V. Dakshinamurthy (debut), Gokulapalan (debut), Ghantasala (debut in Malayalam), Balakrishnan (AIR artiste) and P. Leela.

Tamil
Lyrics were penned by Chidambaram Varadarajan. One song by Mahakavi Bharathiyar was also included in the film. The singer was Lalitha, while the Playback singers were Jikki, P. Leela, Jaanamma, V. Dakshinamurthy, Thiruchi Loganathan, Ghantasala, Gokulapalan and T. A. Mothi.

"Ammaave Deivam Ulaginile", sung by Jikki and "Idhai Yaarodum Sollavum Koodaadhu", sung by T. A. Mothi and Janamma were hits.

Reception
Both Malayalam and Tamil editions of the film fared well at the box office. The film is remembered for the outstanding acting by Aranmula Ponnamma. The film will also be remembered for the debut of Gokulapalan and Dakshinamoorthy as playback singers.

References

External links
 
 Amma at the Malayalam Movie Database

1950s Malayalam-language films
Indian drama films
Indian multilingual films
Films scored by V. Dakshinamoorthy
1950s multilingual films
1952 drama films
1952 films